Natalia Sergeevna Polevshchikova (born 12 July 1985), known professionally as Natasha Poly, is a Russian supermodel. Since 2004, Poly has appeared in prominent high-fashion advertisement campaigns, magazine covers and on runways. Poly established herself as one of the most "in-demand models" of the mid and late 2000s, with Vogue Paris declaring her as one of the top 30 models of the 2000s. She has a total of 61 Vogue Covers.

Early life and career beginnings 
Poly was born on 12 July 1985 in Perm, Russian SFSR, Soviet Union and began modeling locally in 2000. She was discovered in Perm by Mauro Palmentieri and invited to Moscow to participate in the Russian model search competition "New Model Today", where she took the second prize. She made her runway debut with Why Not Model Agency after walking for Emanuel Ungaro in 2004. The year would prove to be her breakout year; she walked in 54 fashion shows in Milan, Paris and New York City, and modelled for the cover of Vogue Paris twice consecutively.

Career 

Poly was one of the faces to headline one of the fourteen covers of V magazine's September 2008 issue. Each cover featured a head shot of a famous model, either from the new crop of leading models (Agyness Deyn, Lara Stone, Anja Rubik, Daria Werbowy, Masha Novoselova etc.) or the supermodel era (Christy Turlington, Naomi Campbell, Eva Herzigova), it was lensed by duo Inez van Lamsweerde and Vinoodh Matadin.

Poly was placed 1st on Fashion Television's First Face countdown three times consecutively (Spring 2008, Fall 2008 and Spring 2009). She was also placed 7th (Spring 2007), 4th (Fall 2009 and Spring 2010) and 5th (Fall 2010). First Face countdown displays the models with the most number of shows opened during a season.

Vogue Paris declared her one of the top 30 models of the 2000s. Poly was part of the Versace Spring/Summer 2016 Campaign, alongside Gigi Hadid and Raquel Zimmermann, shot by Steven Klein. She also appeared in a commercial for Mercedes-Benz, captured by Jeff Mark, entitled 'Obsession with an Icon’, Natasha fronted in a blue latex clad to the Mercedes-Benz SL car. She also became the face for Kurt Geiger's Fall/Winter 2016 Campaign.

Personal life 
Poly married Dutch businessman Peter Bakker on 16 April 2011 in Saint-Tropez. On 13 May 2013 Poly gave birth to a daughter named Aleksandra Christina. In April 2019, she gave birth to a son named Adrian Grey.

References

External links 

 
 
 
 

1985 births
Living people
Russian female models
People from Perm, Russia
L'Oréal people